Michael O'Doherty may refer to:

Michael J. O'Doherty (1874–1949), Archbishop of Manila
Michael O'Doherty (publisher), Irish publisher

See also
Michael Doherty (disambiguation)